Nong Kop is a subdistrict (tambon) of the Ban Pong District, Ratchaburi Province in Thailand.

Overview
Nong Kop Subdistrict is flat. Its name, meaning 'frog pond', derives from the many ponds and marshes in the area where frogs thrive. There is much gravel and sand extraction in the subdistrict, an activity which has left the landscape dotted with small lakes. The sub-district has many Lao Wiang communities. The specialty of the subdistrict is grilled chicken from Bang Tan village.

See also
Khlong Bang Tan Railway Station

References

Tambon of Ratchaburi Province
Populated places in Ratchaburi province